FC Politekhnik-92 Barnaul was a Russian football team from Barnaul. It played professionally from 1992 to 1994. Their best result was 3rd place in the Zone 7 of the Russian Second Division in 1993.

External links
  Team history at KLISF

Association football clubs established in 1992
Association football clubs disestablished in 1995
Defunct football clubs in Russia
Sport in Barnaul
1992 establishments in Russia
1995 disestablishments in Russia